2-Nitroaniline is an organic compound with the formula H2NC6H4NO2. It is a derivative of aniline, carrying a nitro functional group in position 2. It is mainly used as a precursor to o-phenylenediamine.

Synthesis
2-Nitroaniline is prepared commercially by the reaction of 2-nitrochlorobenzene with ammonia:
ClC6H4NO2 + 2 NH3 → H2NC6H4NO2 + NH4Cl

Many other methods exist for the synthesis of this compound. Direct nitration of aniline is inefficient since anilinium is produced instead. Nitration of acetanilide gives only traces of 2-nitro isomer is obtained due to the great steric effect of the amide. Sulfonation is usually used to block the 4 position and increases the effectiveness to 56%.

Uses and reactions
2-Nitroaniline is the main precursor to phenylenediamines, which are converted to benzimidazoles, a family of heterocycles that are key components in pharmaceuticals.

Aside from its reduction to phenylenediamine, 2-nitroaniline undergoes other reactions anticipated for aromatic amines. It is protonated to give the anilinium salts. Owing to the influence of the nitro substituent, the amine exhibits a basicity nearly 100,000x lower than aniline itself. Diazotization gives diazonium derivative, which is a precursor to some diazo dyes. Acetylation affords 2-nitroacetanilide.

See also
 3-Nitroaniline
 4-Nitroaniline

References

External links
 Analysis of 2-Nitroaniline

Anilines
Nitrobenzenes